Crystal Springs is a hydrological spring and a census-designated place (CDP) in Pasco County, Florida, United States.  The population was 1,175 at the 2000 census.

Geography
Crystal Springs is located at  (28.180879, -82.168690).

Demographics

As of the census of 2000, there were 1,175 people, 427 households, and 312 families residing in the CDP. The racial makeup of the CDP was 93.62% White, 0.60% African American, 0.68% Native American, 0.09% Asian, 3.06% from other races, and 1.96% from two or more races. Hispanic or Latino of any race were 5.36% of the population.

There were 427 households, out of which 34.0% had children under the age of 18 living with them, 56.2% were married couples living together, 10.8% had a female householder with no husband present, and 26.7% were non-families. 19.9% of all households were made up of individuals, and 7.7% had someone living alone who was 65 years of age or older.  The average household size was 2.75 and the average family size was 3.15.

In the CDP, the population was spread out, with 27.1% under the age of 18, 8.3% from 18 to 24, 29.2% from 25 to 44, 24.3% from 45 to 64, and 11.1% who were 65 years of age or older.  The median age was 36 years. For every 100 females, there were 102.9 males.  For every 100 females age 18 and over, there were 100.7 males.

The median income for a household in the CDP was $42,578, and the median income for a family was $44,688. Males had a median income of $33,750 versus $19,583 for females. The per capita income for the CDP was $18,346.  About 3.5% of families and 9.8% of the population were below the poverty line, including 7.4% of those under age 18 and 9.5% of those age 65 or over.

Preserve
Crystal Springs Preserve is 525 acres of natural wilderness surrounding Crystal Springs, a Magnitude 2 spring that discharges 30 million gallons of water daily. There is a non-profit educational facility, Crystal Springs Foundation, operating on site with programs that show diverse ecosystems via trails, boardwalks, a wildlife pavilion, a butterfly garden and a nature center.  The preserve is privately owned by Crystal Springs Preserve, Inc., a closely held private company. The spring is the source for Zephyrhills Natural Spring Water, a commercially bottled water product. The water that is bottled represents less than 1% of the flow of the Spring.

References

Census-designated places in Pasco County, Florida
Springs of Florida
Census-designated places in Florida
Bodies of water of Pasco County, Florida